Where There's Smoke... is a 1979 album by Smokey Robinson, released on Motown Records' Tamla label. It contains his Billboard Top ten pop hit single "Cruisin'".

Critical reception

Reviewing for The Village Voice in 1980, music critic Robert Christgau gave the album an "A−" and called it Robinson's best solo album. He said that, despite potential "cavils" from novice Motown purists about the disco version of "Get Ready", the songs on side one especially update Robinson's "concise, smoldering romanticism with a flair that seemed lost to him years ago". Stereo Review magazine's Phil Garland commended him for remaining an unadorned composer and producer, and cleverly underplaying several tracks' "disco flavor". He found the songs pleasurable and consistent, and remarked that, although it may not be a milestone in Robinson's career, Where There's Smoke is "solid, ingratiating music that should wear well." Dave Marsh did view it as a turning point and "genuine creative breakthrough" for Robinson, who finally modernizes his style of soul music without "being compromised." Marsh also felt that he has matured as a vocalist, because of how he immerses his voice around rhythms and tries phrasings that were less evident in his early music. Red Starr, writing in Smash Hits, gave the album a mixed review and described it as "pleasant if tame and unremarkable stuff".

In a retrospective review, Allmusic's William Ruhlmann gave it three out of five stars and said that it may be inconsistent and slightly too "disco-ish in places," even though it restored Robinson's commercial viability. The Mojo Collection (2007) was more enthusiastic and wrote that Robinson had "hit a new vein of excellence" with Where There's Smoke..., "the most vibrant album he'd yet made, climaxing with the gorgeous hit, 'Cruisin'."

Track listing
All tracks composed by Smokey Robinson, except where noted.

 Side one - Smoke
"It's a Good Night" - 5:46
"I Love the Nearness of You" (Robinson, Stevie Wonder) - 4:30
"Hurt's on You" (Lawrence Hanks, Rodney Massey) - 4:16
"Ever Had a Dream" (Robinson, Janie Bradford) - 3:47

 Side two - Fire
<li>"Get Ready" - 5:46
<li>"Share It" - 4:58
<li>"Cruisin'" (Robinson, Marv Tarplin) - 5:53

Personnel
 Smokey Robinson – lead vocals 
 Cheryl Cooper, Ivory Davis, Paula Dickerson, Patricia Henley Talbert, Bernard Ighner, Claudette Robinson, Smokey Robinson, James Sledge, Charles Wright – backing vocals 
Musicians (Tracks 1 & 4-7)
 Reginald "Sonny" Burke – arrangements 
 Reginald "Sonny" Burke, Ronnie McNeir, Ron Rancifer – keyboards
 Paul Jackson Jr., Rick Littlefield, Marv Tarplin, David T. Walker, Wah Wah Watson, Robert White – guitars
 Larry Davis, Chuck Rainey, Wayne Tweed – bass
 James Gadson, Scotty Harris – drums 
 Eddie "Bongo" Brown, James Sledge – bongos, congas
 Jack Ashford, Ivory Davis – tambourine 
 Fred Smith – alto saxophone, flute, flute solos
 Michael Jacobsen – horns, strings 
Track 2
 Stevie Wonder – rhythm arrangements 
 Paul Riser – string arrangements 
 Greg Phillinganes – Fender Rhodes 
 Michael Sembello, Rick Zunigar – guitars
 Nathan Watts – bass
 Dennis Davis – drums
Track 3
 Robert Bowles, Terry Fryer, Paul David Wilson – arrangements
 Terry Fryer, Lawrence Hanks, Roger Harris – keyboards
 Bryan Gregory, Danny Leake – guitars 
 Bernard Reed – bass
 Brian Grice – drums 
 Reginald "Sonny" Burke – cowbell, spoons

Production
 Producers – Smokey Robinson (Tracks 1, 2, & 4-7); Stevie Wonder (Track 2); Jerry Butler and Homer Talbert III (Track 3); Reginald "Sonny" Burke (Track 5).
 Engineers – Roger Dollarhide, Cal Harris and Michael Lizzio.
 Assistant Engineer – Gail Ritter
 Mixing – Michael Lizzio and Smokey Robinson
 Mix Assistants – Randy Dunlap and Gail Ritter
 Product Manager – Brenda M. Boyce
 Project Coordinator – Billie Jean Brown
 Art Direction – John Calbaka
 Design – Ginny Livingston
 Cover Photography – Claude Mougin

Charting History

Weekly Charts

Year-end Charts

Singles

References

External links
 

1979 albums
Smokey Robinson albums
Albums produced by Smokey Robinson
Tamla Records albums
Albums produced by Stevie Wonder